Mycale hentscheli is a marine sponge, which is known to be a rich source of bioactive small molecules. These natural products originate from the sponge's microbiota. Examples of these molecules include the potent cytotoxic polyketides: pateamine, peloruside, and mycalamide.

References

External links
 Anti-cancer sponge:the race is on for aquaculture supply

Poecilosclerida
Taxa named by Jane Fromont
Taxa named by Patricia Bergquist